The 2021–22 Chicago State Cougars women's basketball team will represent Chicago State University in the 2021–22 NCAA Division I women's basketball season. They are led by second-year head coach Tiffany Sardin. The Cougars play their home games at the Emil and Patricia Jones Convocation Center, located in Chicago.

Roster

Schedule

|-
!colspan=9 style=|Non-conference regular season

|-
!colspan=9 style=|WAC conference season

Schedule source:

See also
2021–22 Chicago State Cougars men's basketball team

References

Chicago State
Chicago State Cougars women's basketball seasons
2020s in Chicago
Chicago State
Chicago State